Kalgadarreh-ye Yek (also Romanized as Kalgadarreh-ye Yek; also known as Kalak Darreh, Kalakdarreh-ye Yek, Kalgeh Darreh, and Kalk Darreh) is a village in Qilab Rural District, Alvar-e Garmsiri District, Andimeshk County, Khuzestan Province, Iran. At the 2006 census, its population was 295 in 63 families.

References 

Populated places in Andimeshk County